One Land, Five Nations is a documentary (in two parts) by Mahmoud Shoolizadeh. It introduces the cultural and social and geographical life of the people in Faridan in Isfahan Province of Iran. In this region, five different Nations: Armenians, Lors, Georgian, Turkish and Persian are living peacefully together, celebrating their own languages, customs and cultures.
This film participated in The first short films festival in Tehran, Iran, where it became candidate for the best documentary film and best photography in 1990

Technical specifications and Film crew 

One Land, Five Nations

16 mm, 45 & 35mins, Documentary in two parts, Iran, 1989
Researcher, Script writer and Director: Mahmoud Shoolizadeh,
Photograph: Mohammad Abedi,
Edit : marziyeh Soleymani,
Music: Saeed Sharifiyan
Producer: Javad Peyhani ( I.R.I.B, Isfahan )

1989 films
Iranian documentary films
1989 documentary films